Trillo Nuclear Power Plant is a nuclear power station in Spain.

It consists of one pressurized water reactor (PWR) of 1066 MWe. Construction of unit one began in 1979, and first criticality was on 14 May 1988.

A planned second identical unit was cancelled soon after construction began following a change of government in 1983.

See also

Nuclear power in Spain

External links
 WISE News Communique archive July 21, 1995: Spanish banks to assume nuclear debt.
 Nuclear News Country Review: SPAIN (1994) at the INSC website.

Unfinished nuclear reactors
Nuclear power stations in Spain
Nuclear power stations using pressurized water reactors
Energy in Castilla–La Mancha